Liwa al-Quds or the Jerusalem Brigade is a predominantly Palestinian militia (brigade) that operates as a part of pro-Syrian government forces in the Syrian Civil War. It was formed in 2013 by the engineer Muhammad al-Sa'eed. The fighters who call themselves the 'Syrian Arab Army Fedayeen' are active in Aleppo, distributed on the periphery of the camp and south of al-Nayrab military and civil airport. They are also present in Aziza village, Sheikh Latfi, and around the Air Intelligence building and the Greatest Messenger mosque. The group is composed of predominantly Sunni Palestinians from the al-Nayrab district as well as the former refugee camp Handarat. Liwa al-Quds is believed to be the largest loyalist auxiliary force operating in Aleppo.

History 
The militia was founded in 2013, reportedly with the support of the Air Force Intelligence Directorate. Syrian opposition supporters regard them as Shabiha.

By the beginning of 2015, the group had suffered 200 killed and over 400 wounded since its establishment. The group supported the Syrian Army in its effort to reopen the main supply line to Aleppo in late 2015.

By mid-2016, it had become one of the most important pro-government militias in Aleppo Governorate. On 20 June 2016, the militia took part in a prisoner exchange with three rebel factions, namely the Sultan Murad Division, the Muntasir Billah Brigade, and the Nour al-Din al-Zenki Movement, in coordination with Ahrar al-Sham.

In June 2017, Liwa al-Quds launched a recruitment campaign in Homs Governorate, where it aimed at enlisting young Palestinian refugees.

In May 2018 Liwa al-Quds was fighting against the ISIL pocket in the desert of Deir ez-Zor Governorate as a part of joint operation with the NDF and SAA forces. Liwa al-Quds captured village of Faydat Umm Muwaynah.

In July 2018, Samer Rafe, a prominent commander of the militia, was arrested in Latakia after a firefight with government forces. He had previously been arrested on charges of robbery in Aleppo, confessed to the charges, and served a prison term of one year before being released.

In the first half of 2019, Liwa al-Quds suffered heavy casualties on multiple fronts, most notably during Operation Dawn of Idlib.

Compostition 
The brigade has both Syrian Palestinian as well as native Syrian members. The militia has close connections to both Iran and Russia, and is supplied as well as trained by the Russian Armed Forces. Its fighters refer to themselves as "Syrian Arab Army Fedayeen", showcasing their loyalty to the Syrian military. Before the government victory in the Battle of Aleppo, the brigade consisted of three main battalions, which are: Lions of al-Quds Battalion, which operated in al-Nayrab camp and its surrounding as well as in southern and eastern countryside of Aleppo; the Deterrence Battalion, which operated in the north Aleppo countryside south of the villages of Nubl and Al-Zahraa; and the Lions of al-Shahba' Battalion, which operated inside Aleppo city.

By 2018, the group had started recruiting former Syrian rebels that agreed to join pro-government military units as part of reconciliation deals with the Syrian government. More than 150 former Free Syrian Army fighters had joined Liwa al-Quds by 2019. They received military training and supervision from Russian officers during the first quarter of 2019.

See also 

 List of armed groups in the Syrian Civil War
 Palestinians in Syria

References 

Anti-ISIL factions in Syria
Palestinian militant groups
Pro-government factions of the Syrian civil war
Military units and formations established in 2013
Axis of Resistance